Wang Zhaoyuan (王照圓 ;Shandong, 4 October 1763–1851) was a Chinese female Confucian scholar and writer. Unusually for a woman scholar, she was distinguished by her philological scholarship, not poetry. Her main work consists of annotations to Liu Xiang's (79-8 BCE) Biographies of Exemplary Women (Lienü Zhuan) and the Lives of the Taoist Transcendents (Liexian Zhuan). She also shared Liu Xiang's interest in the interpretation of dreams.

Works
Annotations to Liu Hsiang's Liexian Zhuan
Annotations to Liu Hsiang's Lienü Zhuan
Book of Dreams (梦书 Meng Shu)

References

1763 births
1851 deaths